Strengthen What Remains is an American hardcore and metal band. They come from Tampa, Florida. The band started making music in 2007. The band released a studio album, Humanity, in 2010, with On the Attack Records. They signed to Blood & Ink Records, where they released, Turning a Blind Eye, another studio album, in 2013. Their subsequent release, Justice Creeps Slow, an extended play was released by Blood and Ink Records, in 2015.

Background
Strengthen What Remains is a hardcore band from Tampa, Florida. They count as their members Josh White, Phil Amos, and Danny Mills.

Music history
The band commenced as a musical entity in 2010, with their first release, Humanity, a studio album, that was released on November 1, 2010, from On the Attack Records. They were signed to Blood and Ink Records, where they released another studio album, Turning a Blind Eye, on August 13, 2013. Their subsequent release, an extended play, Justice Creeps Slow, was released on June 9, 2015, by Blood & Ink Records. Most recently, SWR released a 2017 Promo on January 27, 2017.  The band announced that they plan to disband sometime in late 2018 or early 2019. They played their final show in January 2019 during the FYA Fest 6 Pre-Show. A month later in February 2019, the band published their final two songs via Bandcamp, the two song release titled "Crisis of Faith". Members of the band have a new band, Exit Strategy.

Members
Current members
 Josh White (2007-2019)
 Phil Amos (2016-2019)
 Danny Mills

Former members
 Dev Stroud (2010-2016)
 Joe Finney (2013-2014)
 Davy Ball (2011-2016)
 Anthony O'Neal
 Guy Gaffney (2011-2014)

Discography
Studio albums
 Humanity (November 1, 2010, On the Attack)
 Turning a Blind Eye (August 13, 2013, Blood and Ink)
EPs
 Justice Creeps Slow (June 9, 2015, Blood and Ink)
 2017 Promo (January 27, 2017, Blood and Ink)
 "Crisis of Faith" (February 6, 2019, Self Released via Bandcamp)

References

External links
 Facebook page

Musical groups from Florida
2010 establishments in Florida
Musical groups established in 2010
Blood and Ink Records artists
OnTheAttack Records artists